Bright Osayi-Samuel (born 31 December 1997) is a Nigerian professional footballer who plays as a wing-back or winger for Süper Lig club Fenerbahçe and the Nigeria national team.

Early life 
Osayi-Samuel was born in Okija, Nigeria, then moved with his family to Spain before emigrating to England when he was ten years old, settling in Woolwich, London.

Career

Blackpool 
Osayi-Samuel was a youth academy graduate of Blackpool. He made his professional debut on 7 March 2015 in a 1–0 home defeat to Sheffield Wednesday.

Queens Park Rangers
On 1 September 2017, Osayi-Samuel joined Championship side Queens Park Rangers on a three-year deal. He made his debut as a substitute against Burton Albion on 23 September.

Fenerbahçe 	
On 15 January 2021, Osayi-Samuel signed a pre-contract agreement to join Turkish side Fenerbahçe on a four-year deal beginning in July 2021. In a turn of events, he joined the club on 23 January in an immediate transfer.

International career 
On 11 November 2022, Osayi-Samuel received his first International call-up from Nigeria to play in a friendly game against Portugal. He was in the starter eleven and played 90 minutes for his international debut.

Career statistics

Honours
Blackpool
EFL League Two play-offs: 2017

References

External links
 
 

1997 births
Living people
People from Anambra State
Nigerian footballers
English footballers
Nigerian emigrants to the United Kingdom
Association football midfielders
Black British sportspeople
Footballers from Woolwich
English Football League players
Süper Lig players
Blackpool F.C. players
Queens Park Rangers F.C. players
Fenerbahçe S.K. footballers
Expatriate footballers in Turkey
English expatriate footballers
Nigerian expatriate footballers
English expatriate sportspeople in Turkey
Nigerian expatriate sportspeople in Turkey